Great Torrington School is a mixed secondary school located in Great Torrington in the English county of Devon.

Previously a foundation school administered by Devon County Council, Great Torrington School was converted to academy status on 1 August 2011. However the school continues to coordinate with Devon County Council for admissions. Pupils are normally admitted from Beaford Primary School, Buckland Brewer Primary School, Dolton CE Primary School, Great Torrington Junior School, Horwood & Newton Tracey Primary School, Langtree Community School, Monkleigh Primary School, Shebbear Community School, The Clinton CE Primary School and West & East Putford School.

Following a summer 2018 protest in which male pupils wore skirts and female pupils supported them by wearing trousers, accompanied by a petition, the school agreed in 2019 that pupils would be permitted to wear shorts during the summer term, while still requiring them to adhere to other aspects of the school's uniform policy.

References

External links
 

Secondary schools in Devon
Academies in Devon
Great Torrington